Abdul Karim Luaibi Bahedh (born 1959) is an Iraqi politician who served as the minister of oil of Iraq between December 2010 and 8 September 2014.

Early life and education
Luaibi was born into a Shiite family in Baghdad in 1959. He holds a bachelor of science degree in petroleum engineering, which he received from Baghdad University in 1982.

Career and activities
From 1982 to 1998, Luaibi worked in several oil companies. He began to work at state-owned South Oil Company in 1982. In 1998, he joined the ministry of oil, and served in different positions until 2009. He was appointed deputy minister of oil in charge with the upstream operations in 2009, and was in office until 2010. During his tenure, he was instrumental in securing the oil and gas contracts with international oil companies and other oil-related agreements with neighboring countries of Iraq.

In December 2010, he was appointed oil minister, replacing Hussain Al Shahristani, to the cabinet headed by prime minister Nouri Maliki. Luaibi was part of the Iraqi National Alliance. He acted as the president of OPEC's 162nd ordinary meeting which was held in Vienna on 12 December 2012.

Corruption 
In March 2016, an investigate report published on the Huffington Post revealed that Luaibi was part of a major corruption ring in the Iraqi oil industry. The report noted that Luaibi played a role in securing oil contracts for foreign oil companies in exchange for bribes.

Family 
Luaibi is married and has six children.

References

1959 births
Living people
Oil ministers of Iraq
University of Baghdad alumni
Iraqi engineers
Iraqi Shia Muslims